Manhattan Plaza is an album by saxophonist Ricky Ford. It was recorded on August 1, 1978 and released by Muse Records the following year.

Background
This was Ford's first album for Muse Records and his second recording as leader. The band was a principally a quintet: Ford on tenor sax, trumpeter Oliver Beener, pianist Jaki Byard, bassist David Friesen, and drummer Dannie Richmond. Byard had been one of Ford's teachers at the New England Conservatory of Music. Manhattan Plaza was the building that Ford and other musicians lived in.

Recording and music
The album was recorded at the Van Gelder Recording Studio in Englewood Cliffs, New Jersey, on August 1, 1978. It was produced by Richard Seidel. Of the seven tracks, three were composed by Ford, three by Byard, and one was a standard ("If You Could See Me Now"). Byard's "Olean Visit" was first recorded in 1967, whereas this was the first recording of "Fadism". Beener does not play on "Afternoon in New York". "Ceal's Place" is a blues. The AllMusic reviewer described the playing as "advanced hard bop". "Diane's Melody" is played as a Ford–Byard duet. The album was released by Muse in 1979.

Track listing
"Fadism" (Jaki Byard) – 7:19
"Afternoon in New York" (Ricky Ford) – 4:40
"Diane's Melody" (Byard) – 3:30
"Ceal's Place" (Ford) – 4:12
"On the Plaza" (Ford) – 6:15
"If You Could See Me Now" (Tadd Dameron) – 4:52
"Olean Visit" (Byard) – 6:16

Personnel
Ricky Ford – tenor sax
Oliver Beener – trumpet
Jaki Byard – piano
David Friesen – bass
Dannie Richmond – drums

References

1978 albums
Muse Records albums
Ricky Ford albums
Albums recorded at Van Gelder Studio